Æthelfrith (died  616) was King of Bernicia and Deira in northern England.

Æthelfrith or Aethelfrith may also refer to:

 Æthelfrith of Elmham (died  745), Bishop of Elmham
 Æthelfrith of Mercia (fl. 883–915), Ealdorman in Mercia